Necedah Airport  is a public use airport located one nautical mile (2 km) northwest of the central business district of Necedah, a village in Juneau County, Wisconsin, United States. It is owned by the Village of Necedah.

Although many U.S. airports use the same three-letter location identifier for the FAA and IATA, this facility is assigned DAF by the FAA but has no designation from the IATA (which assigned DAF to Daup Airport, Daup, Papua New Guinea).

Facilities and aircraft 
Necedah Airport covers an area of 93 acres (38 ha) at an elevation of 919 feet (280 m) above mean sea level. It has one runway designated 18/36 with an asphalt surface measuring 2,721 by 60 feet (829 x 18 m).

For the 12-month period ending June 29, 2022, the airport had 8,950 aircraft operations, an average of 24 per day: 99% general aviation and 1% air taxi. In February 2023, there were 9 aircraft based at this airport: all 9 single-engine.

See also 
 List of airports in Wisconsin

References

External links 
  at Wisconsin DOT Airport Directory
 

Airports in Wisconsin
Buildings and structures in Juneau County, Wisconsin